The Bayer designation Omicron Cancri (ο Cnc / ο Cancri) is shared by two stars in the constellation Cancer:
 ο1 Cancri
 ο2 Cancri
They are separated by 0.27° on the sky. With a physical separation of 0.2163 parsec (0.705 light-year), the stars most likely form a co-moving pair.

References

Cancri, Omicron
Cancer (constellation)
Double stars